In the U.S. state of Mississippi, U.S. Routes are maintained by the Mississippi Department of Transportation (MDOT).



Mainline highways

Special routes

See also

References

 
U.S.